Hungarian Rhapsody No. 14, S.244/14, in F minor, is the fourteenth Hungarian Rhapsody by Franz Liszt. The Hungarian Fantasy, written in 1852, is an arrangement of the rhapsody for piano and orchestra.  An average performance of the piece lasts about twelve minutes.

Sources of the melodies 
This rhapsody is composed of several distinct melodies. Some of them are Hungarian folk songs, such as Magosan repül a daru. Others are of uncertain origin; they may have been written by Liszt himself.

References

External links 
 

14
1847 compositions

Compositions in F minor